Karl Ernst Albrecht Wagner (3 June 1827 in Berlin – 15 February 1871 in Dôle) was a German physician and surgeon.

He studied medicine at the universities of Berlin and Heidelberg, receiving his doctorate in 1848 with the dissertation-thesis "De Spatulariarum anatome". He served as a military physician during the First Schleswig War, then in 1849–50 participated in a study tour to Paris and Vienna. Afterwards, he returned to Berlin as an assistant to surgeon Bernhard von Langenbeck. In 1852 he qualified as a lecturer, and during the following year was named a senior physician at the city hospital in Danzig.

In 1858 he was appointed a professor of surgery at the University of Königsberg and a director of the surgical clinic. In 1866 he was named vice-rector of the university. He served as a general physician and consultant surgeon in the Austro-Prussian War. He held a similar position in the Franco-Prussian War, during which, he died from typhus at a field hospital in Dôle, France.

His treatise on the resection of bones and joints was translated into English and published by the New Sydenham Society in a work titled: "Selected monographs" (1859). The book also included treatises written by Adolph Kussmaul, Adolf Tenner and Albrecht von Graefe.

References 

1827 births
1871 deaths
Physicians from Berlin
Humboldt University of Berlin alumni
Heidelberg University alumni
Academic staff of the University of Königsberg
German surgeons